Gagea pratensis, called the yellow star-of-Bethlehem, is a European and Mediterranean plant species in the lily family. It is widespread across much of Europe as well as Turkey and Morocco. It was first described to science by Persoon in 1794.

Gagea pratensis is a bulb-forming perennial. Flowers are generally yellow, sometimes with a green stripe along the backside of each tepal.

formerly included
Gagea pratensis var. paczoskii, now called Gagea transversalis

References

External links
 Czech Botany, Gagea pratensis in Czech with color photo
 Tela Botanica in French, with color photo plus French distribution map
 Wilde Plante in Nederland en België in Dutch with several color photos
 Latvijas daba, Pļavas Zeltstarīte, Gagea pratensis in Latvian with color photo

pratensis
Plants described in 1794
Flora of Europe
Flora of Turkey
Flora of Morocco